Deutsche Schule in der Provinz Málaga or Deutsche Schule Málaga (DS Málaga) is a private German international school in Marbella, Malaga Province, Spain. It serves years 1-12, The education begins in early childhood, and ends with Oberstufe/Bachillerato.

The pastor of the German Evangelical Church and the former consul of the Empire of Germany established the school, which educated German and Spanish children and was founded in 1898. It closed in 1945, at the end of World War II, but was re-established in 1967 by Hans (Juan) Hoffmann Heinkeder (Berlin, 1916-Málaga, 1998), the German Consul General in Malaga at the time.

References

External links
  Deutsche Schule Málaga
  Deutsche Schule Málaga

German international schools in Spain
Buildings and structures in Marbella
1898 establishments in Spain
Educational institutions established in 1898